The Roman Catholic Diocese of Bilbao  is a diocese located in the city of Bilbao and Province of Biscay in Northern Spain. It is part of the Ecclesiastical province of Burgos.

History
 November 2, 1949: Established as Diocese of Bilbao from the dioceses of Vitoria and  Santander.

Territory
The Diocese of Bilbao covers all the territory of Biscay, except the exclave of Orduña (between Alava and Burgos), and including the tiny enclave of Valle de Villaverde (Cantabria).
The diocese is divided in seven territorial vicarages:
 Encartaciones Bajas
 Encartaciones Altas
 Bilbao-Abando
 Durango-Arratia
 Gernikaldea
 Bilbao-Begoña

Bishops of Bilbao
Casimiro Morcillo González (13 May 1950 – 21 September 1955); transferred to Zaragoza
Pablo Gúrpide Beope (19 December 1955 – 18 November 1968), died in office
Antonio Añoveros Ataún (3 December 1971 – 25 September 1978), renounced
Luis María de Larrea y Legarreta (16 February 1979 – 8 August 1995), renounced
Ricardo Blázquez Pérez (8 September 1995 – 15 March 2010); transferred to Valladolid (Cardinal in 2015)
Mario Iceta Gavicagogeascoa (11 October 2010 – 5 December 2020)
Joseba Segura Etxezarraga (11 May 2021 – present)

Special churches

Minor Basilicas:
Basílica de la Asunción de Nuestra Señora/Andra Mariaren Zeruratzea, Lekeitio, Vizcaya, País Vasco
 Basílica de la Purísima Concepción (Sortzez Garbia), Elorrio, Vizcaya, País Vasco
 Basílica de Nuestra Señora de Begoña/Begoñako Andra Mari, Begoña, Vizcaya, País Vasco
 Santa María de Portugalete/Nazareteko Andra Mari, Portugalete, Vizcaya, País Vasco
 Santa María de Uribarri/Uribarriko Andra Mari, Durango, Vizcaya, País Vasco

Basílica de la Asunción de Nuestra Señora

History
The church was consecrated in Lekeitio in 1287, and was recorded as under construction in 1374. A century later, in 1487, it was all but ready for use.  The neo-Gothic retrochoir by architect Casto de Zavala was added between 1881 and 1884, thanks to benefactor Pascual Abaroa

Building
The church consist of three staggered naves in four sections and a polygonal chevet at the centre, the latter surrounded by a lower retro-choir. On the main wall there is a narrow gallery, in the form of windows with sills decorated with blind tracery.  The church has one of the finest triforia in all Basque Gothic Architecture.  The archivolted west door is set into a façade blooming with tiny original sculptured decorations.  The tower consists of an ancient shaft that rises to roof level and a more modern belfry above.

Furniture
The church is presided by a superb polychrome wood retable.  The retable recounts the life of the Virgin in narrative and symbolic references.

See also
Roman Catholicism in Spain

References

External links
 GCatholic.org
 Catholic Hierarchy 
  Diocese website
 Basílica de la Asunción de Nuestra Señora de Lequeitio (Spanish language Wikipedia)
 Basílica de la Asunción de Nuestra Señora homepage (english language)
 Andra Mariaren Zeruratzea
 Basilique L´Asuncion du Notre-Dame
 Basilica photographs

Roman Catholic dioceses in Spain
Christian organizations established in 1949
Bilbao
Roman Catholic dioceses and prelatures established in the 20th century
1949 establishments in Spain